The 3rd AARP Movies for Grownups Awards, presented by AARP the Magazine, honored films released in 2003 made by people over the age of 50. As was customary for the awards at this point, there was no awards ceremony; instead, the winners were announced in 2004's March/April issue of the magazine. Eugene Levy won the award for Breakaway Performance for A Mighty Wind.

Awards

Winners and Nominees

Winners are listed first, highlighted in boldface, and indicated with a double dagger.

Breakaway Performance
 Eugene Levy: "Who'da thunk that Levy — whose characters on TV and in some 40 movies served as poster boys for the clueless unhip — would turn in this nuanced performance as an emotionally damaged folk singer? Oh, but don't get us wrong—he's as funny as ever, too."

Runners Up
 Michael Caine for Secondhand Lions
 Kurt Russell for Dark Blue

Films with multiple nominations and wins

References

AARP Movies for Grownups Awards
AARP